The Red River Delta is a large coal field located in the north of Vietnam in Thái Bình Province.

The Red River Delta contains one of the largest coal reserves in Vietnam, having estimated reserves of 210 billion tons of coal.

References 

Coal in Vietnam
Coalfield
Geology of Vietnam
Hong River